São Martinho do Campo is a former civil parish in the municipality of Santo Tirso, Portugal. In 2013, the parish merged into the new parish Campo (São Martinho), São Salvador do Campo e Negrelos (São Mamede). It is located  10 km northeast of the city of Santo Tirso, it's an important textile industry center.

References

Former parishes of Santo Tirso